Allan Wilson (27 April 1916 – 4 February 1984) was an Australian rules footballer who played for the North Melbourne Football Club in the Victorian Football League (VFL).

Notes

External links 

1916 births
1984 deaths
Australian rules footballers from Victoria (Australia)
North Melbourne Football Club players